Chaoa is a genus of braconid wasps in the family Braconidae. There is at least one described species in Chaoa, C. flavipes, found in China.

References

Microgastrinae